Rurak is a surname. Notable people with the surname include:

 Kostyantyn Rurak (born 1974), Ukrainian sprinter
 Olena Rurak (born 1972), Ukrainian sprinter